Athorybia is a genus of cnidarians belonging to the family Agalmatidae.

The species of this genus are found in tropical regions.

Species:

Athorybia lucida 
Athorybia rosacea

References

Agalmatidae
Hydrozoan genera